The Compaq Portable 386 is a computer released by Compaq Computer Corporation in 1987.  It was equipped with a  Intel 80386 CPU,  RAM,  ROM,   floppy,  hard disk drive, priced at  respectively, and a  gas-plasma display.  

Early versions of the Compaq Portable 386 were sold with the Compaq Portable III case and badges. A differing screen bezel stating "386/20" was the only externally visible change.

Network General resold a customized version of the Compaq Portable 386 as the "Sniffer" Network Analyzer.

Technical data in detail

CPU and FPU 
The Portable 386 got its name due to the socketed Intel 386DX CPU with 20MHz. There is also an additional socket for a 20MHz 387 FPU option, which was not included in the basic configuration of the Portable. Since the whole system bus runs with CPU frequency, there is no way to improve the CPU performance by installing a 386DX CPU with more than 20MHz other than the rare Cyrix 486DRx2 20/40 which has a multiplicator of 2 for the frequency while being still pinout compatible with the 386 socket.

Memory 
The mainboard can take up to four proprietary 512KB SIMMs which were called SC-RAM in the Portable manual. Additionally, there was an expansion slot inside the Portable which allowed to expand the memory by another 8MB alongside the 2MB on the mainboard by:

Installing the so-called 32bit Memory-/Modem board expansion offers a socket for another expansion card which has 4MB (8×512 KB 80 ns) of memory and another expansion socket installed on which the user can install a 3rd expansion card with another 4MB (again 8×512 KB 80 ns) of RAM. These RAM expansion cards were available through Compaq or third party manufacturers, such as Kingston Technology.

Graphics card 
The graphics card can be configured between CGA and MDA emulation mode whereas the CGA mode is mandatory for using Microsoft Windows' Compaq Plasma Driver and graphic capabilities in general. The internal CGA graphics card is able to display a resolution up to 640x400 pixels with a color depth of 2 bits (monochrome), which has been first seen in the AT&T 6300 built by Olivetti, surpassing the original IBM standard by 200 pixels in height while remaining fully CGA compatible elsewhere. 

The internal gas plasma display is able to display 640x400 pixels with up to 16 shades of gray and is connected to the graphics card via a proprietary connector. Users can install a better graphics card via the Compaq Expansion Unit (more on it later), but cannot use it with the internal display for sure.

Hard disk 
The Portable offers two drive bays for 5.25" half-height drives where one is reserved for the hard disk and the other one for the internal floppy disk drive. Compaq originally offered a 40MB and 100MB hard disk option. Quite common back in the days, the BIOS of the Compaq only offers to select preconfigured hard disk configurations like Type 17 for 40MB or 42 for 504MB. There is no detailed information about the underlying CHS configuration of these types available. The device suffers from the wide-spread CHS barrier, not allowing hard disk drives greater than 504MB.

Floppy Disk Drive 
In its basic configuration, Compaq offered only a single 5.25" 1.2MB floppy disk drive aside of the 40MB hard disk drive, but there was also a cheaper option for a secondary 5.25" 360KB floppy disk drive instead of the hard disk. Giving the fact that the Portable uses a standard floppy drive connector and has built-in support in the BIOS, one can easily replace the 5.25" with a 3.5" 1.44MB drive.

External expansion options 
In order to better position the Portable as a professional office computer, Compaq also offered multiple external expansion which can be installed on the back of the Portable while the device is turned off.

 Compaq Expansion Unit
 As mentioned before, there is an expansion unit available which extends the Portable by two full-size 16bit ISA slots. Compaq advertised ISA cards like the COMPAQ-VG-Controller card to be used with the expansion unit. This card allows to display (for back-then standards) groundbreaking 720×400 pixels for text and 640×480 pixels for graphics with up to 256 colors (palette of 256.000 colors) at the same time on an external Compaq VG display.
 Compaq Expansion Unit with a 40MB tape drive
 There was also an expansion unit for a 40MB tape drive offered, which looks identical to the ISA expansion unit from outside, except for offering only a slot for the tape drive.

Internal expansion options 
Compaq offered multiple expansion cards for the Portable 386, which can be installed inside the main housing. Similar to the external expansions, these internal expansion cards cannot be exchanged while the device is turned on.

 32bit Memory-/Modem board expansion (carrier board)
 This expansion card is mandatory for installing additional expansion cards. It is not only a carrier board for other expansions, but also offers a 2400 baud modem.
 1-2MB memory expansion
 The 1-2MB memory expansion must be installed on the 32bit carrier board and comes with 1MB of RAM preinstalled and offers two more SC-RAM slots for 1MB SC-RAM memory modules each. It cannot be used together with the other 4MB memory expansions due to a missing connector.
 4MB memory expansion
 This expansion also requires the carrier board to be installed and offers 4MB of preinstalled memory.
 4MB additional memory expansion
 This extension board for the 4MB memory expansion card just offers another 4MB of preinstalled memory and is installed on top of the 4MB memory expansion. It maxes out the supported memory of 10MB.
 Asynchronous connection extension
 This expansion card offers only an RS232 connector. It cannot be used together with the carrier board.
 1200 resp. 2400 Baud Modem
 This expansion was only available in form of a set including a 1200 or 2400 baud Hayes-compatible modem, an own carrier board, a housing cover with a modem connector and a telephone cable for the American and Canadian markets.

BIOS 
The BIOS setup utility is not preinstalled in an EPROM chip, but comes on a single floppy disk. If a user is no longer owning such a disk, it can be still easily found at archive.org/details/CompaqPortableDiagnosticDisk
 3.5″ 720KB version: SP0308.EXE / SP0308.ZIP or
 5.25″ 360KB version: SP0316.EXE / SP0316.ZIP

Software 
Compaq bundled Compaq-DOS in version 3.31 with the Portable 386, a variant of MS-DOS 3.2 which already offered support for FAT16 and hard disk partitions with more than 32MB. A Windows 2.01 OEM version was also available which makes use of the 386 memory management. There was also a User Programs disk bundled with the Portable which offers tools for memory management and adapting the CPU speed (between 6, 8 and 20MHz):

 ADAPT.COM (Advanced Display Attribute Programming Tool) a TSR application to configure the CGA/MDA charsets on the fly.
 CACHE.EXE (Compaq Disk Cache) works similar to the commonly known SmartDrive in alter MS-DOS versions
 CEMM.EXE (386 CPU) / CEMMP.EXE (286 CPU),Compaq Expanded Memory Manager,  a memory manager which is incompatible with Windows 3.x.
 CHARSET.COM installs an alternative character set and font (called THINUS) to improve the text display on the internal gas plasma display
 CLOCK.SYS a driver for the real time clock of the Portable 386
 MODE.COM replaced the default MODE.COM application of MS-DOS and allows additional commands like "MODE SEL MDA", "MODE SEL CGA", "MODE SPEED HIGH", "MODE SPEED LOW" to switch on the fly between the Portable's graphics and CPU frequency modes.
 VDISK.SYS is a virtual disk driver which makes use of the RAM.

See also
 Rabbit 286, a clone by Chicony Electronics

References

386